Infomania is a feeling of being overwhelmed by digital information.

Informania may also refer to:

InfoMania, the American TV series on Current TV
Infomania (Russian TV series),  a news programme broadcast in Russia on STS channel